The word "prayojana" is a Sanskrit term which denotes the ultimate goal or object of attainment. Along with sambandha and abhidheya, prayojana is one of the three fundamental concepts in Gaudiya Vaishnava theology, where it is used to describe the ultimate goal of life - Prema, or pure love of Krishna.

Literature

External links
 Prayojana in «Chaitanya-charitamrita»

Hindu philosophical concepts
Vaishnavism
Hindu astrology
Medieval literature